Henry Anders Peter Brask Andersen (23 June 1896 – 26 November 1970) was a Danish amateur track cyclist who won the sprint event at the 1921 World Championships. He was the national champion in the sprint in 1918–1921 and 1926–1928. He competed in the sprint and tandem events at the 1920 Summer Olympics, but failed to reach the finals.

His son Kield Brask Andersen won the Danish sprint title in 1939.

References

External links
 

1896 births
1970 deaths
Danish male cyclists
Cyclists at the 1920 Summer Olympics
Olympic cyclists of Denmark
Cyclists from Copenhagen